Halosaurotrema is a genus of trematodes in the family Opecoelidae. It consists of one species, Halosaurotrema halosauropsi (Bray & Campbell, 1996) Martin, Huston, Cutmore & Cribb, 2018.

References

Opecoelidae
Plagiorchiida genera